Wyvern Light Car Co.Ltd. was a British automobile manufacturer which traded from 1913–1914 in Twickenham, then in Middlesex (now a part of London). The cyclecar was powered by a four-cylinder, in-line, 10.53 hp. Chapuis-Dornier engine driving the rear wheels.

See also
 List of car manufacturers of the United Kingdom

References

David Culshaw & Peter Horrobin: The Complete Catalogue of British Cars 1895-1975. Veloce Publishing plc. Dorchester (1997). 

Defunct motor vehicle manufacturers of England
Cyclecars
Motor vehicle manufacturers based in London